State University of Southwestern Bahia (UESB) was founded in 1980 in the city of Vitória da Conquista, in the Brazilian state of Bahia. Today it has three campuses, located in the cities of Vitória da Conquista, Jequié and Itapetinga. It currently offers 43 undergraduate and postgraduate degree programs.

External links
UESB - http://www.uesb.br (in Portuguese)

Universities and colleges in Bahia
Educational institutions established in 1980
1980 establishments in Brazil
Bahia